Just Do It is the second album recorded by the Dutch pop rock music singer Kim-Lian. It was released on 28 October 2006 in the Netherlands. Three singles were released before the album: "Road to Heaven", "In Vain", and the download only single "Feel". Kim-Lian had recently broke with her label CMM Records in a dispute over the target audience of her music. She was subsequently signed by Bass Commander Records. She has produced this album herself.

Track listing

Singles

2006 albums
Kim-Lian albums